Juan Pablo Gómez Vidal (born 11 May 1991), is an Argentine-born Chilean footballer who plays as a right-back for Chilean Primera División club Universidad de Chile since 2023.

Club career
In November 2022, he joined Universidad de Chile for the 2023 season.

International career
In 2010, he took part of Argentina squad at under-20 level.

Personal life
Born in Buenos Aires, Argentina, Gómez came to Chile at the age of 5 and after naturalized Chilean.

Honours
Universidad Católica
 Chilean Primera División (1): 2010 season
 Copa Chile (1): 2011

References

External links
 

1991 births
Living people
Footballers from Buenos Aires
Argentine footballers
Argentina under-20 international footballers
Argentine expatriate footballers
Argentine emigrants to Chile
Naturalized citizens of Chile
Chilean footballers
Club Deportivo Universidad Católica footballers
Coquimbo Unido footballers
A.C. Barnechea footballers
Unión La Calera footballers
Universidad de Concepción footballers
San Luis de Quillota footballers
Unión Española footballers
Curicó Unido footballers
Universidad de Chile footballers
Chilean Primera División players
Primera B de Chile players
Argentine expatriate sportspeople in Chile
Expatriate footballers in Chile
Association football defenders
Association football midfielders